Steiger is a surname originating in the ancient city and canton of Bern, Switzerland, where persons bearing it may be considered to have made a significant early contribution to feudal society and thus to have affected the early development of Europe. Notable people and fictional characters with this surname include:

Allan Steiger, fictional character of the television soap opera Neighbours
Anna Steiger (born 1960), British opera singer
Bill Steiger (born 1933), American football player
Brad Steiger (1936–2018), American author
Captain Oskar Steiger, fictional character of the 1970 film Patton
Douglas and Maurice Steiger, American farmers and founders of Steiger Tractor
Eduard von Steiger (1881–1962), Swiss politician
Emil H. Steiger (1871–1921), American businessman and politician
Sophie and Harwood Steiger, American textile artists and printmakers
Isabelle de Steiger (1836–1927), English painter, theosophist, occultist and writer
Janet Dempsey Steiger (1939–2004), American politician
Jakob Robert Steiger  (1801 – 1862) was a Swiss politician and President of the Nacional Council
Joan Benedict Steiger (born 1927), American actress 
Joel Steiger (1942–2021), American television producer, writer and director 
Johann Rudolf de Steiger (1778–1834), Swiss nobleman
Kurt and Karl Von Steiger, professional wrestlers
Lieuwe Steiger (1924–2006), Dutch football goalkeeper
Niklaus Friedrich von Steiger (1729–1799), Swiss politician
Otto Steiger (1909–2005), Swiss writer and radio news speaker
Otto Steiger (1938–2008), German economist and professor
Paul Steiger (born 1942), American journalist
Pepper Steiger, fictional character of the television soap opera Neighbours
Pierre-Enric Steiger, president of Björn Steiger Foundation
Rand Steiger (born 1957), American composer, conductor and pedagogue
Rod Steiger (1925–2002), American actor
Rolf Steiger, Austrian football defender and coach
Sam Steiger (born 1929–2012), American politician, journalist, political pundit and rancher
Siegfried and Ute Steiger, founders and owners of Björn Steiger Foundation
Tobias "Dobbs" Steiger, fictional character of the television series Der Clown
Ueli Steiger (born 1954), Swiss cinematographer
William A. Steiger (1938–1978), American politician
William R. Steiger (born 1969), worker at the U.S. Department of Health and Human Services

Swiss-language surnames